Aaron R. Hudson (died 1907) was an American soldier and recipient of the Medal of Honor.

Biography 
Born in Madison County, Kentucky, Hudson served as a private in Company C of the 17th Indiana Volunteer Mounted Infantry Regiment during the American Civil War. Hudson earned his medal in April 1865 at Culloden, Georgia for "Capture of flag of Worrill Grays (C.S.A.).". His medal was issued on June 17, 1865. Hudson is buried in Ragan Cemetery, Neosho, Missouri.

References

External links 
FindaGrave

19th-century births
1907 deaths
Year of birth missing
United States Army Medal of Honor recipients
American Civil War recipients of the Medal of Honor
People from Madison County, Kentucky